Major Chandrakanth is a 1966 Indian Tamil-language drama film written and directed by K. Balachander. Based on his play of the same name, the film stars Major Sundarrajan, Nagesh, R. Muthuraman, A. V. M. Rajan and Jayalalithaa. Produced by A. V. Meiyappan of AVM Productions, it revolves around a retired and blind major who gives asylum to a fugitive wanted for committing murder, unaware that the victim was his younger son.

Major Chandrakanth was released on 11 November 1966, during Diwali. It became a commercial success, and won two Chennai Film Fans' Association Awards: Best Film, and Best Supporting Actor (Muthuraman). Sundarrajan, who portrayed the title role, later became popularly known with the prefix "Major".

Plot 

Mohan is a tailor who lives with his younger sister Vimala. Orphaned at an early age, Mohan goes through a life of hardship and fulfills all his sister's wishes. Rajinikanth, a womaniser, lures Vimala and cheats on her. Unable to face her brother, she commits suicide. Mohan confronts Rajinikanth and kills him in revenge. Now a fugitive, Mohan hides in the house of Chandrakanth, a retired and blind major

Mohan is amused and fascinated by Chandrakanth's virtues and how he manages to live though he is blind. Mohan reveals why he is on the run from law and ironically, the deceased happens to be Chandrakanth's youngest son. Chandrakanth feels humiliated for nurturing Rajinikanth and is sorry for Mohan's plight. Ultimately, Chandrakanth's elder son Srikanth, an inspector, arrests Mohan along with his own father for showing hospitality to a criminal.

Cast 
Major Sundarrajan as Chandrakanth
Nagesh as Mohan
R. Muthuraman as Srikanth
A. V. M. Rajan as Rajinikanth
Jayalalithaa as Vimala

Production 
In October 1963, it was announced that K. Balachander had sold the film rights of his play Major Chandrakanth; the film adaptation would be directed by P. Madhavan for Nithyakalyani Films, and star Sivaji Ganesan, but was later shelved. Instead, the play was adapted into a Hindi film Oonche Log in 1965, with a different cast and crew. A. V. Meiyappan later decided to produce a Tamil film adaptation of the play under his banner AVM Productions with the same title, and Balachander was chosen as director, as it was Meiyappan's long-time desire that Balachander make a film for AVM.

Sundarrajan, who portrayed the blind major Chandrakanth in the Tamil play, reprised his role in this film. The character's sons Srikanth and Rajinikanth were played by R. Muthuraman and A. V. M. Rajan respectively, replacing Venky and Govindarajan. Jayalalithaa was cast as Vimala, unlike the play where the same character was unseen. The film was the only collaboration between her and Balachander. Nagesh was cast as Vimala's brother Mohan, replacing Gokulnath. The role was a departure from the comedic roles he was then generally known for. Cinematography was handled by S. Maruti Rao, the art direction by A. K. Sekhar, and the editing by R. G. Gopu. Meiyappan's sons Murugan, Kumaran and Saravanan were assistant producers. The final length measured .

Soundtrack 
The music was composed by V. Kumar, while the lyrics were written by Vaali and Suratha. The song "Kalyana Sapadu Podava" is set in the Carnatic raga known as Sindhu Bhairavi. The song "Oru Naal Yaaro", picturised on Mohan going to prove to the audience in his neighbourhood that his Vimala is singing on the radio, became a chartbuster.

Release and reception 
Major Chandrakanth was released on 11 November 1966, during Diwali. In a review dated 26 November 1966, The Indian Express said Sundarrajan brought not only "complete conviction and dignity" to his role but also "revels his rare characterisational depth and sensitivity." The reviewer also praised the performances of Nagesh, Jayalalithaa, Muthuraman and Rajan, the photography and the editing. A critic from Kalki praised the performances of the cast, particularly Sundarrajan, but felt the film looked like a play in many places. The film won two Chennai Film Fans' Association Awards: Best Film, and Best Supporting Actor (Muthuraman).

Legacy 
Following the film's commercial success, Sundarrajan became popularly known with the prefix "Major". During the making of Apoorva Raagangal (1975), Balachander rechristened newcomer Shivaji Rao Gaekwad as Rajinikanth, named after A. V. M. Rajan's character, and Rajinikanth went on to become one of the most successful stars of Tamil cinema.

References

Bibliography

External links 
 

1960s Tamil-language films
1966 drama films
1966 films
AVM Productions films
Fictional portrayals of the Tamil Nadu Police
Films about blind people in India
Films directed by K. Balachander
Films scored by V. Kumar
Films with screenplays by K. Balachander
Indian drama films
Indian films about revenge
Indian films based on plays